The European Track Cycling Championships are a set of elite level competition events held annually for the various disciplines and distances in track cycling, exclusively for European cyclists, and regulated by the European Cycling Union (UEC). They were first held in their current format in 2010, when elite level cyclists competed for the first time following an overhaul of European track cycling.

Background 
The UEC agreed with the governing bodies of six other major European sports from 2018 to integrate its four Olympic-class events, including track cycling, into the new European Championships event on a quadrennial basis. Beginning with 2018, every fourth edition of the competition will form part of the multi-sport event.

While track cycling also forms part of the 2019 European Games in Minsk, these events are not regarded as European Championships but as the Cycling programme of the European Games, and the UEC event will also be held later in the same year. Conversely, the events held in Glasgow in 2018, and Munich in 2022 as part of the multi-sport European Championships are treated as official UEA championships

Format 
In line with cycling tradition, winners of an event at the championships are presented with, in addition to the gold medal, a special, identifiable jersey. This UEC European Champion jersey is a white and blue jersey with gold stars. Gold stars on a blue background have been an identifiably European symbol since the adoption of the Flag of Europe by the Council of Europe.

The most successful nation since the inauguration of the elite event is Great Britain, the event's genesis coinciding with Britain's rise to dominance in world track cycling. The most successful individual rider in the history of the Elite event is Katie Archibald of Great Britain, who has won, as of the 2023 UEC European Track Championships, 20 European titles. Among nations in the championships, aside from Great Britain itself, only Russia, Germany, Netherlands and France have won more gold medals than Archibald.

Pre-History
The first European Track Championships were held in Berlin in 1886 and featured only 5 km and 10 km men's scratch races.

Age group championships

Prior to 2010, championship events were run under the same name, but solely for junior and under-23 cyclists, and the 2010 event is recognised as the first elite level senior championships. Since 2010, separate annual European championships for under-23 and junior riders have continued, described explicitly as such.

European Track Cycling Championships have been held for junior and under-23 athletes for a long time, though records in earlier editions are incomplete. They provided useful experience for young riders with winners automatically qualifying to compete at the UCI Track Cycling World Championships in which no age limit applied, and the world's best track cyclists competed.

A European Masters Track Championships also exists for riders over 35 years old.

Derny, Madison and Omnium championships

Men's European Track Championships for the "motor-paced" or "derny" track cycling discipline have been held since 1896. A separate European Madison championship event was also run for men.

Separate elite European Omnium Championships have been held since 1959, which were later incorporated into the senior European Track Championships on their introduction in 2010.

Founding of the modern Elite Championships

In 2010 the UEC instigated a significant overhaul of how cyclists qualify for the Olympic Games. As a result, the European Championships was also introduced for elite level European cyclists. The first elite championships thereafter took place at the beginning of November 2010. It followed the same ten event schedule for the 2012 Olympics but also included the Madison "due to popular demand".

The Under 23 and Junior championships thereafter were run as an annual separate event.

Elite Competitions (2010-present)

Editions

Venues

All-time medal table (2010–2023)

Most successful riders 
Below is a table of the most successful male and female riders at the European Track Cycling Championships from 2010 onwards. The most successful rider of either sex is Katie Archibald, with 20 European titles and 26 medals; in the history of the Championships, only Germany, Netherlands, France, Italy and Russia, in addition to her own nation, have won more gold medals than Archibald. The most successful male athlete is Dutch sprinter Jeffrey Hoogland on 14 gold medals and 18 medals total, the same numbers as Archibald's Madison and team pursuit partner Laura Kenny. Kenny was the first rider to reach ten championship jerseys, a feat only equalled by Archibald, their fellow Brit Elinor Barker, Hoogland, and Russian sprint pair Anastasia Voynova and Daria Shmeleva.

up to date after 2023 UEC European Track Championships.

Male

Female

Golden 'hat-tricks'. 
No rider has won four gold medals at a single championships. The following riders have won a 'hat-trick' of three gold medals at a single championships on at least one occasion, the first being the Russian sprinter Anastasia Voynova in 2014: Katie Archibald of Great Britain has achieved the feat on three occasions, a record, with three different combinations of events, and is the only rider to achieve a 'hat-trick' without winning gold in either the team pursuit or team sprint. The most hat-tricks claimed in one championships was in the 2023 championships when Archibald and sprinters Harrie Lavreysen of the Netherlands, and Lea Friedrich of Germany won three golds apiece. Uniquely, all three won their respective 'Olympic' trebles by winning all three available golds in their Olympic events - Team pursuit, Omnium and Madison for Archibald, Team sprint, sprint and keirin for Lavreysen and Friedrich, a feat achieved by no rider prior to 2023.

Riders are listed in order of their first 'hat-trick':

Most successful in each event 
22 Events are held as part of the European championships. The table below summarises the most successful athlete and nation in each of the 22 separate events. The numbers in parenthesis represent the number of golds, silvers and bronze respectively won by the athlete or nation in that specific event. Athletes and nations are differentiated in the standard way, first by number of golds, then silvers, then bronze medals. Although both the Omnium and Madison had stand alone championships prior to 2010, only those contested at the European Track Cycling Championships from that year forward are included.

The most dominant rider in a  single event is Laura Kenny who has won the women's team pursuit on eight occasions. This is also the event where a single nation is most dominant; Great Britain have won nine of the editions of the team pursuit, and medalled on a further two occasions. Kenny is also the most dominant rider in any event for individual riders, with four gold and two silver medals across various editions of the omnium. The records for medals in a single event is the 13 medals won by Russia in the 500 metre time trial.

Katie Archibald holds the unique distinction of having been a European Champion across seven different events; team pursuit (7), individual pursuit (4), Scratch race (1), points race (1), Eliminator (1), omnium (4) and madison(2).

up to date after 2023 UEC European Track Championships.

Juniors and U23's and Open Omnium 

Exclude Men's Open Madison events from 2001 to 2009 and include Open Omnium events from 2001 to 2009.

All-time medal table (2001-2020)
Exclude Men's Open Madison events from 2001 to 2009 and include Open Omnium events from 2001 to 2009.

 2008,2014,2015 have share medals.

Disciplines
 UEC European Track Championships (under-23 & junior)
 UEC European Track Championships – Men's omnium
 UEC European Track Championships – Men's madison
 UEC European Track Championships – Men's sprint
 UEC European Track Championships – Men's team sprint
 UEC European Track Championships – Derny
 UEC European Track Championships – Stayer
 UEC European Track Championships – Women's omnium
 UEC European Track Championships – Women's madison
 UEC European Track Championships – Women's sprint
 UEC European Track Championships – Women's team pursuit

Notes

References

External links
Official website of the 2010 European Track Cycling Championships

 
European cycling championships
European Track Championships